”The Evolution of Human Science” (also known as "Catching Crumbs from the Table") is a science fiction short story by American writer Ted Chiang, published in June 2000 in Nature. The story was also included in the collection Stories of Your Life and Others (2002).

Plot summary
The story does not have any characters. The progress in the future has split humanity into two classes: ordinary people and so-called metahumans, who are genetically modified and have a much more powerful intelligence than do ordinary people. The development of the metahumans' science becomes so advanced that it forces the ordinary scientists to switch to interpreting and decoding the metahumans' achievements, because common people are no longer able to create anything fundamentally new. The science then becomes the means of seeking and establishing communication with the super-intelligent metahumans.

Awards
The short story was nominated for the 2001 Locus Poll Award.

See also
"The Colonel" by Peter Watts
Superintelligence
Technological singularity
Transhumanism

References

External links 
 

Science fiction short stories
2000 short stories
Short stories by Ted Chiang